Athyma is a genus of brush-footed butterflies. They are commonly known as the "true" or "typical" sergeants, to distinguish them from the false sergeants of the genus Pseudathyma, a fairly close relative from the Adoliadini tribe. The genus ranges from Tibet to the Solomon Islands, but does not occur in New Guinea or Australia.

Species
Listed alphabetically:
Athyma abiasa Moore, 1858
Athyma alcamene C. & R. Felder, 1863
Athyma adunora
Athyma arayata C. & R. Felder, 1863
Athyma asura Moore, 1858 – studded sergeant
 Athyma asura baelia (Fruhstorfer, 1908)
Athyma cama Moore, 1858 – orange staff sergeant
 Athyma cama zoroastes (Butler, 1877)
Athyma cosmia Semper, 1878
Athyma disjuncta Leech, 1890
Athyma epimethis C. & R. Felder, 1863
Athyma eulimene (Godart, [1824])
Athyma eupolia Murayama & Shimonoya, 1962
Athyma fortuna Leech, 1889
 Athyma fortuna kodahirai (Sonan, 1938)
Athyma glora Kheil, 1884
Athyma godmani Staudinger, 1889
Athyma gutama Moore, 1858
Athyma inara Doubleday, 1850 – colour sergeant
Athyma jagori Fruhstorfer, 1906
Athyma jina Moore, 1857 – Bhutan sergeant
 Athyma jima sauteri (Fruhstorfer, 1912)
Athyma kanwa Moore, 1858 – dot-dash sergeant
Athyma karita Doherty, 1891
Athyma kasa Moore, 1858
Athyma larymna (Doubleday, [1848]) – great sergeant
Athyma libnites (Hewitson, 1859)
Athyma nefte (Cramer, [1780]) – colour sergeant
Athyma maenas C. & R. Felder, 1863
Athyma magindana Semper, 1878
Athyma marguritha Fruhstorfer, 1898
Athyma mindanica Murayama, 1978
Athyma minensis Yoshino, 1997
Athyma opalina (Kollar, [1844]) – Himalayan sergeant
 Athyma opalina hirayamai (Matsumura, 1935)
Athyma orientalis Elwes, 1888
Athyma perius (Linnaeus, 1758) – common sergeant
Athyma pravara Moore, 1857 – unbroken sergeant
Athyma punctata Leech, 1890
Athyma ranga Moore, 1857 – blackvein sergeant
Athyma recurva Leech, 1893
Athyma reta Moore, 1858 – Malay staff sergeant
Athyma rufula de Nicéville, [1889] – Andaman sergeant
Athyma selenophora (Kollar, [1844]) – staff sergeant
 Athyma selenophora laela (Fruhstorfer, 1908)
Athyma separata Staudinger, 1889
Athyma speciosa Staudinger, 1889
Athyma sulpitia (Cramer, [1779]) – spotted sergeant
Athyma zeroca Moore, 1872 – small staff sergeant

References

External links
Images representing Athyma at EOL
Images representing Athyma at BOLD

 
Limenitidinae
Nymphalidae genera
Taxa named by John O. Westwood